John Henry White (born August 28, 1955) is a former gridiron football running back who played ten seasons in Canadian Football League for the BC Lions. He was a part of the Lions 1985 Grey Cup winning team.

College
White played college football at Louisiana Tech University.

Honors
White was enshrined in the Louisiana Tech University Athletic Hall of Fame, Class of 1995.

References

1955 births
Living people
Canadian football running backs
Louisiana Tech Bulldogs football players
BC Lions players
Players of American football from Shreveport, Louisiana